Debating Sharia: Islam, Gender Politics, and Family Law Arbitration is a 2012 book edited by Jennifer Selby and Anna C. Korteweg in which the authors focus on the legal ramifications of Sharia law in the context of Western liberal democracies and examine the issue from different methodological perspectives.

References

External links 
 Debating Sharia: Islam, Gender Politics, and Family Law Arbitration

2012 non-fiction books
University of Toronto Press books
Edited volumes
Secularism in Europe
Secularism in North America
Sharia in Europe
Sociology of religion
Books in political philosophy